Elsa Caroline Giertz (born 26 May 1958) is a Swedish author and television presenter. From 1996 to 1998, Giertz hosted news panel show Måndagsklubben, broadcast on Swedish channel Kanal 5, and is also known for hosting paranormal show Det Okända, broadcast on TV4 and Sjuan between 2006 and 2019. Giertz is also an author and has published several books since the 1990s.

Personal life 
Giertz is the granddaughter of architect Lars Magnus Giertz, and niece of his brother Bo Giertz, who was a bishop. Her great great grandfather, Lars Magnus Ericsson, was the founder of telecommunications manufacturer Ericsson, and author Martin Giertz is her second cousin once removed. Giertz and her partner, television producer Nicola Söderlund, had one daughter, Simone Giertz, who is a popular inventor and YouTube creator.

In a 2012 interview, Giertz said that she had been diagnosed with ADHD, which she suspects has influenced her fondness for building and decorating.

Bibliography
Stor (1993) Normal publishers (pocket 2007)
Ashimas Bok (2006) Normal publishers
24 Timmar I Oktober (2007) Normal publishers
Den Sista Dagen (2008) Normal publishers

References

External links

Swedish television hosts
Living people
1958 births
Swedish women television presenters
20th-century Swedish women writers
21st-century Swedish women writers